Sir Norman Charles Wright FRSE CB FRIC (1900–1970) was a British chemist and agriculturalist. He is remembered as a nutrition scientist. He rose to be the main advisor on nutrition to the United Nations based in Rome.

In the 1960s he was seen as the man able to solve the world's food problems.

Life
He was born in Reading, Berkshire on 19 February 1900, the second son of Rev Francis Henry Wright, first registrar at the University of Reading, and his second wife, Agnes Mary Dunkley. He was educated at the Choir School attached to Christ Church Cathedral, Oxford, his classmates including William Walton. He then studied Sciences at Oxford University specialising in Chemistry. He graduated MA in 1922 then did a doctorate at Cambridge University gaining his PhD in 1925. He specialised in food and nutrition research.

From 1924 to 1926 he spent two years at the National Institute for Research in Dairying based in Reading then spent a year at Cornell University in America, under a Commonwealth Fund Fellowship. This was followed by a year in Washington DC at the United States Department of Agriculture.

In 1930 he was appointed first permanent Director of the recently created Hannah Dairy Research Institute in Ayr in south-west Scotland, following two years on a temporary contract there. In 1936 he made an important study trip to India with Sir John Russell, advising on the Indian dairy industry.

In 1945 he was elected a Fellow of the Royal Society of Edinburgh. His proposers were James Ritchie, James Edward Nichols, Alan William Greenwood and Thomas J. Mackie.

After the Second World War (in 1947) he was appointed Chief Scientific Advisor to the Ministry of Food (succeeding Sir Jack Drummond) and was central to the food rationing system in post-war Britain and in attempts to keep the population healthy and well-fed. From this important role in 1959 he moved to be Deputy Director General of the United Nations Food and Agriculture Organisation, advising on an international level to multiple countries around the world. This was based in Rome. He continued this role until 1963 when he went into semi-retiral. He joined the British Association that year.

He was knighted by Queen Elizabeth II in 1963. Leeds University awarded him an honorary doctorate (LLD) in 1967.

He died at home, 65 Addison Road in London on 16 July 1970.

Publications

Family

In 1928 he married Janet Robison Ledingham Rennie, daughter of Dr John Rennie of Aberdeen

References

1900 births
1970 deaths
People from Reading, Berkshire
Fellows of the Royal Society of Edinburgh
British nutritionists